In the conflict of laws, the validity and effect of a contract with one or more foreign law elements will be decided by reference to the so-called "proper law" of the contract.

History
Until the middle of the 19th century, the courts applied the lex loci contractus or the law of the place where the contract was made to decide whether the given contract was valid. The apparent advantage of this approach was that the rule was easy to apply with certain and predictable outcomes. Unfortunately, it was also open to abuse, e.g. the place could be selected fraudulently to validate an otherwise invalid contract; it might lead to the application of laws with no real connection with the transaction itself, say, because the parties signed the agreement while on holiday; or it might have been difficult to decide where the contract was made, e.g. because it was negotiated and signed on a railway journey through several states.

To avoid these difficulties, some courts proposed applying the lex loci solutionis or the law of the place of performance of the contract. This produced difficulties in cases where the contract required each party to perform its obligations in a different country, or where the place of performance was dictated by later circumstances. However, as the public policies driven by the theory of freedom of contract evolved, the Doctrine of Proper Law emerged.

Proper law
The proper law of the contract is the main system of law applied to decide the validity of most aspects to the contract including its formation,  validity, interpretation, and performance. This does not deny the power of the parties to agree that different aspects of the contract shall be governed by different systems of law. But, in the absence of such express terms, the court will not divide the proper law unless there are unusually compelling circumstances. And note the general rule of the lex fori which applies the provisions of the proper law as it is when the contract is to be performed and not as it was when the contract was made.

The parties to a valid contract are bound to do what they have promised. So, to be consistent, the Doctrine of Proper Law examines the parties' intention as to which law is to govern the contract. The claimed advantage of this approach is that it satisfies more abstract considerations of justice if the parties are bound by the law they have chosen. But it raises the question of whether the test is to be subjective, i.e. the law actually intended by the parties, or objective, i.e. the law will impute the intention which reasonable men in their position would probably have had. It cannot safely be assumed that the parties did actually consider which of the several possible laws might be applied when they were negotiating the contract. Hence, although the courts would prefer the subjective approach because this gives effect the parties' own wishes, the objective test has gained in importance. So the proper law test today is three-stage:
it is the law intended by the parties when the contract was made which is usually evidenced by an express choice of law clause; or
it is imputed by the court because either the parties incorporated actual legal terminology or provisions specific to one legal system, or because the contract would only be valid under one of the potentially relevant systems; or
if there is no express or implied choice, it is the law which has the closest and most real connection to the bargain made by the parties.
It is only fair to admit that the task of imputing an intention to the parties in the third situation presents the courts with another opportunity for uncertainty and arbitrariness, but this overall approach is nevertheless felt to be the lesser of the available evils.

Express selection
When the parties express a clear intention in a choice-of-law clause, there is a rebuttable presumption that this is the proper law because it reflects the parties' freedom of contract and it produces certainty of outcome. It can only be rebutted when the choice is not bona fide, it produces illegality, or it breaches public policy. For example, the parties may have selected the particular law to evade the operation of otherwise mandatory provisions of the law which has the closest connection with the contract. The parties are not free to put themselves above the law and, in such cases, it will be for the parties to prove that there is a valid reason for selecting that law other than evasion.

Implied selection
When the parties have not used express words, their intention may be inferred from the terms and nature of the contract, and from the general circumstances of the case. For example, a term granting the courts of a particular state exclusive jurisdiction over the contract would imply that the lex fori is to be the proper law (see forum selection clause).

Closest and most real connection
In default, the court has to impute an intention by asking, as just and reasonable persons, which law the parties ought to, or would, have intended to nominate if they had thought about it when they were making the contract. In arriving at its decision, the court uses a list of connecting factors, i.e. facts which have an unambiguous geographical connection, and whichever law scores the most hits on a league table created from the list will be considered the proper law. The current list of factors includes the following:
the habitual residence/domicile/nationality of the parties;
the parties' main places of business and of incorporation;
the place nominated for any arbitration proceedings in the event of a dispute (the lex loci arbitri);
the language in which the contract documents is written;
the format of the documents, e.g. if a form is only found in one relevant country, this suggests that the parties intended the law of that country to be the proper law;
the currency in which any payment is to be made;
the flag of any ship involved;
the place where the contract is made (which may not be obvious where negotiations were concluded by letter, fax or e-mail);
the place(s) where performance is to occur;
any pattern of dealing established in previous transactions involving the same parties; and
where any insurance companies or relevant third parties are located.

Dépeçage
Some legal systems provide that a contract may be governed by more than one law.  This concept is referred to as dépeçage.  Article 3(1) of the Rome Convention on the law applicable to contractual obligations expressly recognises dépeçage in contracting states.

Problems
There are many problems affecting this area of law, but two of the most interesting are:

Incapacity through age
States approach the issue of intentionality from two related, but distinct, conceptual directions:
liability in which the law holds individuals responsible for the consequences of their actions, and
exculpability in which fundamental social policies exclude or diminish the liability that actors would have incurred in different circumstances.
Many states have policies which protect the young and inexperienced by insulating them from liability even though they may have voluntarily committed themselves to unwise contracts. The age at which children achieve full contractual capacity varies from state to state but the principle is always the same. Infants are not bound by many otherwise valid contracts, and their intention is irrelevant because of the legal incapacity imposed on them by the state of the domicile (the lex domicilii) or nationality (the lex patriae). This recognises a set of social values that requires exculpation even though there is relevant action and consent freely given.

Equally, states have an interest in protecting the normal flow of trade within their borders. If businesses had constantly to verify the nationality or domicile of their customers and their ages, this might slow down business and, potentially, infringe privacy legislation. Hence, conflicts of public policy can emerge which complicate the choice of law decision and invite forum shopping, i.e. traders will always seek to sue infants with whom they have contracts in those states which accord priority to commercial interests, while children will seek the avoidance of liability in the courts which protect their interests. This would be achieved during the characterisation stage by classifying the issue as status and its incidents rather than contract because a party's status and lack of capacity would be in rem.

Mistake, misrepresentation, etc.
In many states, fundamental mistakes, misrepresentations and similar defects may make a contract void ab initio, i.e. the defect is so serious that it prevents an agreement from ever coming into being. If this happens, every term in the contract including the express selection of the proper law, would be unenforceable. This raises the question of whether the lex fori should operate a policy of saving the validity of contracts wherever possible. Suppose that a contract would be valid under many potentially relevant laws but not under the putative proper law, and that, until problems arose, the parties have acted in good faith on the assumption that they will be bound by the agreement, some courts might be tempted to ignore the apparent proper law and choose another that would give effect to the parties general contractual intentions.

English law
In English law, the Contracts (Applicable Law) Act 1990 formally incorporates the Convention on the Law Applicable to Contractual Obligations the "Rome Convention") opened for signature in Rome on June 19, 1980, and signed by the United Kingdom on December 7, 1981; the Convention on the Accession of the Hellenic Republic to the Rome Convention (the "Luxembourg Convention") signed by the United Kingdom in Luxembourg on April 10, 1984; and the first Protocol on the Interpretation of the Rome Convention by the European Court (the "Brussels Protocol") signed by the United Kingdom in Brussels on December 19, 1988.

Conflict of laws
Contract law